Strange Music is an American independent record label founded by Tech N9ne and Travis O'Guin in 1999, specializing in hip hop music. It is currently distributed through Fontana Distribution.

Album releases

1.  This listing combines the numbers of both the original 2001 release, Anghellic, as well as the 2003 re-release, Anghellic: Reparation. The peak position on the Independent Chart comes from the re-release, while the other positions are those of the original. As of July 29, 2009, the original release has sold 82,700 or more copies, while the re-release has sold 180,520 or more copies. The number in the table is a collective total between the two releases.

Instrumental albums

EP releases

Compilation and soundtrack releases

Mixtape releases

Video releases

Upcoming album releases

References

External links

Hip hop discographies
Discographies of American artists